Ilievski (Macedonian Илиевски), feminine Ilievska (Macedonian Илиевска) is a common Macedonian family name.

Notable individuals
Dimitar Ilievski-Murato, Macedonian alpinist
Nikola Ilievski-Džidži, former footballer, current manager
Vlado Ilievski, basketball player, currently for KK Cedevita
Vlatko Ilievski, singer
Ilija Ilijevski, Actor

Surnames
Macedonian-language surnames